Naki, or Munkaf, is an Eastern Beboid language of Cameroon and Nigeria. There is no name for the language; it is known by the villages it is spoken in, including Naki and Mekaf (Munkaf) in Cameroon and Bukwen and Mashi in Nigeria, the latter listed as separate languages by Ethnologue, though they are not distinct.

References

Sources
 Blench, Roger, 2011. 'The membership and internal structure of Bantoid and the border with Bantu'. Bantu IV, Humboldt University, Berlin.

Beboid languages
Languages of Cameroon
Languages of Nigeria